Fox River is the name of:

Populated places

Canada 
Fox River, Nova Scotia

Panama 
Folks River, Panama, a city and river in Colón Province, Panama, formerly called Fox River

United States 
Fox River, Alaska
Fox River Township, Davis County, Iowa
Fox River, Wisconsin, an unincorporated community

Rivers

Canada 
Fox River (Manitoba), a tributary of the Hayes River
Ontario
Fox River (Cochrane District)
Fox River (Kenora District)
Fox River (Thunder Bay District)

New Zealand 
Fox River (Buller), in the Paparoa National Park, Buller District
Fox River (Westland), a tributary of the Cook River, Westland District

United States 
Fox River (Fish River tributary), Seward Peninsula, Alaska
Fox River (Alaska), Kenai Peninsula
Fox River (Illinois River tributary), runs from Wisconsin into Illinois
Fox River (Little Wabash tributary), in Illinois
Fox River (Wabash tributary) in Illinois that is a tributary of the Wabash River near New Harmony, Indiana
Fox River (Michigan), a river in the Upper Peninsula
Fox River (Mississippi River), in Iowa and Missouri
Fox River (Green Bay tributary), flows into Green Bay

In fiction
Fox River State Penitentiary, a fictional prison in Illinois in the TV show Prison Break

See also
Fox Creek (disambiguation)
Fox Crossing (disambiguation)